Little Daddy is a 1931 Our Gang short comedy film directed by Robert F. McGowan. It was the 105th (17th talking episode) Our Gang short that was released.

Plot
Farina and Stymie are orphans and staying in a small flat near a black community church. The authorities want to put Stymie into an orphanage. Farina is sad about this but attempts to have a goodbye for Stymie with help from the gang. As Farina gets the food set up, Stymie eats it quicker than the gang could arrive. As the gang arrives, a man from the orphanage arrives to take Stymie to the home. The gang then attacks him in order to stop him from taking Stymie away. Miss Crabtree, their teacher, arrives on the scene and presumably settles matters.

Notes
Little Daddy was removed from the Little Rascals television package due to perceived racism toward African Americans.
This was the last appearance of Bobby Young, who portrayed "Bonedust".

Cast

The Gang
 Matthew Beard as Stymie
 Allen Hoskins as Farina
 Norman Chaney as Chubby
 Jackie Cooper as Jackie
 Dorothy DeBorba as Dorothy
 Bobby Hutchins as Wheezer
 Mary Ann Jackson as Mary Ann
 Shirley Jean Rickert as Shirley
 Douglas Greer as Douglas
 Donald Haines as Donald
 Bobby Young as Bonedust
 Pete the Pup as himself

Additional cast
 Charley Chase as Chubby's singing voice
 Otto Fries as Orphan asylum agent
 June Marlowe as Miss Crabtree
 George Reed as The Parson
 The Etude Ethiopian Chorus as Church parishioners

See also
 Our Gang filmography

References

External links

1931 films
American black-and-white films
1931 comedy films
Films directed by Robert F. McGowan
Hal Roach Studios short films
Our Gang films
Films with screenplays by H. M. Walker
1931 short films
1930s American films